Harrison Township is a township in Kossuth County, Iowa, United States.

History
Harrison Township was established in 1890. It is named for President Benjamin Harrison.

References

Townships in Kossuth County, Iowa
Townships in Iowa
1890 establishments in Iowa
Populated places established in 1890